35th parallel may refer to:

35th parallel north, a circle of latitude in the Northern Hemisphere
35th parallel south, a circle of latitude in the Southern Hemisphere